Erlandia inopinata is a species of beetle in the family Cerambycidae. It was described by Per Olof Christopher Aurivillius in 1904.

References

Cerambycinae
Beetles described in 1904